Jessica Blank (born in New Haven, Connecticut), is an American actress, writer, and director who works in film, television, and theater. She is also a consultant and public speaker on story and social change.

Early life and education
Blank grew up in New Haven and Washington, D.C., and attended Macalester College and the University of Minnesota.

Personal life 
In 2001, she married the actor, writer and director Erik Jensen. They frequently collaborate professionally, primarily as writing partners for theater, film and television.

Career

Acting 
As an actress, Blank appeared regularly in CBS' "Made in Jersey". She has also appeared on "Blue Bloods", "Elementary", "The Following", "The Mentalist", HBO’s "High Maintenance", "Bored to Death", "Rescue Me", "Law and Order: Criminal Intent", "The Bronx Is Burning", and several other shows. In film, she has appeared in  The Namesake, Slender Man, The Exonerated, and You're Nobody 'til Somebody Kills You,  and over a dozen indies including "Creative Control" (Grand Jury Prize, SXSW 2015) and "On the Road With Judas" (Sundance).  She has acted in theaters throughout New York City.  In 2015 she played the role of Heather Drake in the 16th episode of the 5th season of the CBS police procedural drama Blue Bloods on the episode "In The Box"

Play writing and directing 
Blank and Jensen co-wrote The Exonerated, a play based on interviews they conducted with more than 40 exonerated death row inmates. In spring 2002, they co-directed The Exonerated at The Actors' Gang Theater. That production was nominated for five Ovation Awards and three NAACP Awards, won the Ovation for Best World Premiere Play, and has toured universities nationally. The New York production of The Exonerated ran for more than 600 performances off-Broadway, toured nationally, and won the Outer Critics Circle, Lortel, and Drama Desk awards, as well as awards from Amnesty International, American Bar Association, National Council of Criminal Defense Lawyers and more.. It was adapted as a movie for Court TV starring Brian Dennehy, Danny Glover, Delroy Lindo, Aidan Quinn, and Susan Sarandon.  The play has been produced internationally in Dublin, Edinburgh, and London, in the United Kingdom; and in Japan, Mexico, France, China, Thailand, Iran, and Italy. It has been translated into French, Spanish, Italian, Mandarin, and Japanese. Blank and Jensen's book Living Justice (2005), a memoir about the making of "The Exonerated",  was published by Simon and Schuster.

Blank and Jensen also co-wrote the documentary play Aftermath, based on interviews they conducted in 2008 with Iraqi civilian refugees in Jordan. Blank directed Aftermath off-Broadway at New York Theatre Workshop; it was nominated for two Drama League awards and toured internationally for two years. They have a new documentary play under commission at The Public Theater with original music by Grammy-winning songwriter Steve Earle.

Their play, "How To Be A Rock Critic"  (based on the writings of Lester Bangs), received a commission from Center Theatre Group and was produced at the Kirk Douglas Theater, South Coast Repertory, ArtsEmerson, Steppenwolf Theatre Company, and Off Broadway at The Public Theater, with Jensen starring and Blank directing. They are at work on a new documentary play, under commission from the Public Theater, in collaboration with the Grammy Award-winning musician Steve Earle entitled Coal Country at the Cherry Lane Theatre in New York City.

"Liberty City," a play co-written by Blank and April Yvette Thompson, was produced Off-Broadway by New York Theatre Workshop in 2008, with Blank directing. It has toured to Miami and elsewhere. It was nominated for Lucille Lortel, Drama Desk, and Outer Critics Circle awards, and won Chicago's Jeff award in 2015.

Blank and Jensen wrote "The Line" in 2020 which tells the story about New York City health-care workers fighting against COVID-19.  The one-hour documentary-style production was directed by Blank, produced and presented by the Public, and streamed on YouTube until September 1st, 2020.

Television writer 
Blank also writes for television with Erik Jensen. In 2015 she wrote a pilot for "The Negotiator" for Gaumont TV.

Book author 
Blank's novel, Almost Home, was published in October 2007 by Hyperion. In 2016, Almost Home was made into a feature film, adapted and directed by Blank and Jensen. 

Her second novel, Karma For Beginners, was published by Hyperion in 2009. 

Her third novel, Legacy, was published by Penguin in 2018.  Her writing has also been published in magazines and journals including The Believer, The Dramatist, Another Magazine, and Theatre History Studies.

Acting coach, professor, consultant and speaker 
Jessica is also a coach for professional writers  a professor at Juilliard School and a consultant and frequent speaker on story, neuroscience and social change.

References

External links

https://www.imdb.com/title/tt4357020/?ref_=nm_flmg_act_7
https://www.jessicacblank.com

Living people
American film actresses
American television actresses
21st-century American novelists
American women novelists
Macalester College alumni
University of Minnesota alumni
Writers from New Haven, Connecticut
Year of birth missing (living people)
Actresses from New Haven, Connecticut
American women dramatists and playwrights
21st-century American women writers
Novelists from Connecticut
21st-century American dramatists and playwrights